Robert William Fornelli (born August 9, 1966) is an American college baseball coach and current head baseball coach at Pittsburg State University. Previously, Fornelli coached at his alma mater Emporia State University from 2004 to 2018 where he guided the Hornets to five Mid-America Intercollegiate Athletics Association regular season championships and two conference tournament championships, 13 trips to the NCAA Tournament, two World Series appearances and a national runner-up finish. Fornelli was the coach at Fort Hays State from 1996 to 2003.

Career 
After graduating from Emporia State in 1991 and playing four years at Emporia State, Fornelli spent five seasons as Butler Community College's pitching coach.

Fort Hays State 
In 1996, Fornelli became head coach of the Fort Hays State Tigers. During his seven years, Fornelli compiled a 306–113 record. In 2003, the Tigers won the Rocky Mountain Athletic Conference regular season and postseason tournament titles. Fornelli is the winningest coach in FHSU history and led the Tigers to the RMAC championship four times in his seven years. Fornelli led FHSU to the NCAA Division II national championship game in 2000 and was in the NCAA regional tournament six times.

Emporia State 
In May 2003, Fornelli left Fort Hays State for his alma mater. former Emporia State player under Embery, was named the head coach. Since 2004, Fornelli has taken the Hornets to the NCAA Tournament 10 times, have made 2 World Series appearances and a national runner-up finish in 2009. The Hornets finished the 2006 season by winning the MIAA Regular Season Championship and NCAA Central Region Championship, as well as advancing to the school's first NCAA World Series appearance.

In 2009, the Hornets advanced to the school's first NCAA national championship game in Cary, North Carolina. In 2014, the Hornets won the MIAA Tournament, and earned another trip to the NCAA Tournament. In 2016, Fornelli picked up his 800th overall win.

On April 25, 2018, Fornelli became the winningest head baseball coach in Emporia State history with 558 wins. A week later on May 6, 2018, Fornelli captured his 900th win overall.

Pittsburg State 
On June 4, 2018, local radio station KVOE (AM) reported that Fornelli had accepted the head coaching job at in-state MIAA rival, Pittsburg State University, after 15 seasons at his alma mater. He was formally introduced the next day, June 5.

Head coach record

References

1966 births
Living people
Emporia State Hornets baseball players
Butler Grizzlies baseball coaches
Fort Hays State Tigers baseball coaches
Emporia State Hornets baseball coaches
Pittsburg State Gorillas baseball coaches
People from Lenexa, Kansas